{{DISPLAYTITLE:C11H20O2}}
The molecular formula C11H20O2 may refer to:

 Buciclic_acid
 Ditetrahydrofurylpropane
 2-Ethylhexyl acrylate
 trans-3-Methyl-4-decanolide
 Undecylenic acid